The Sargan–Hansen test or Sargan's  test is a statistical test used for testing over-identifying restrictions in a statistical model. It was proposed by John Denis Sargan in 1958, and several variants were derived by him in 1975. Lars Peter Hansen re-worked through the derivations and showed that it can be extended to general non-linear GMM in a time series context.

The Sargan test is based on the assumption that model parameters are identified via a priori restrictions on the coefficients, and tests the validity of over-identifying restrictions. The test statistic can be computed from residuals from instrumental variables regression by constructing a quadratic form based on the cross-product of the residuals and exogenous variables.

See also 
 Durbin–Wu–Hausman test

References

Further reading 
 
 
 

Statistical tests
Econometric modeling